Richard Osbaldeston (1691–1764) was a Church of England clergyman and Bishop of London from 1762 to 1764.

Life
He was born at Hunmanby in Yorkshire, a younger son of Sir Richard Osbaldeston, a prominent landowner and a rather inactive Member of Parliament. He was the head of the Yorkshire branch of an old Lancashire family. His mother, who died young, was Elizabeth Fountayne of Melton. His grandfather William was also a Member of Parliament and his great-grandfather Richard Osbaldeston had been Attorney General for Ireland. Through his grandmother  Anne Wentworth he was related to the family of Thomas Wentworth, 1st Earl of Strafford, the formidable Lord Lieutenant of Ireland. He graduated MA from St John's College, Cambridge, in 1714, becoming a Fellow of Peterhouse, Cambridge. He was a chaplain to King George II of Great Britain, and tutor to King George III. He became Bishop of Carlisle in 1747. He was a patron of John Jortin.

Notes

External links
Material relating to Bishop Osbaldeston at Lambeth Palace Library

1691 births
1764 deaths
Alumni of St John's College, Cambridge
Bishops of Carlisle
Bishops of London
Deans of the Chapel Royal
Deans of York
18th-century Church of England bishops
Fellows of Peterhouse, Cambridge
Honorary Chaplains to the Queen
People from Hunmanby